The San Diego River is a river in San Diego County, California. Below El Capitan Dam, the river runs west through Santee and San Diego. While passing through Tierrasanta it goes through Mission Trails Regional Park, one of the largest urban parks in America. 

It flows near the Mission San Diego de Alcalá. The river's valley downstream from there is known as Mission Valley for that reason. The valley forms a transportation corridor for Interstate 8 and for the San Diego Trolley Green Line. The river discharges into the Pacific Ocean near the entrance to Mission Bay, forming an estuary.

History 

The river has changed its course several times in recorded history. Prior to 1821, the San Diego River usually entered San Diego Harbor. In the fall of 1821, however, a flood changed the river channel in one night, and the greater volume of the flow was diverted into what was then known as False Bay (now referred to as Mission Bay), leaving only a small stream still flowing into the harbor (J. C. Hayes 1874). This flood was remarkable in that no rain fell along the coast. The river was later observed to flow into San Diego Harbor in 1849 and 1856, and the U. S. Coast and Geodetic Survey map of 1859 shows it to be flowing there once again. Because of the high deposition rate of the river, which threatened to ruin San Diego Bay as a harbor, the federal government diverted the flow into Mission Bay and built a levee embankment of earth extending from near Old Town to Point Loma in the fall of 1853 (Derby 1853). Later that year, heavy rains caused the river to change course once again, washing out part of the levee and resuming its old course into the harbor (San Diego Herald 1855). 

The worst flood in this area was in 1862. This was part of the Great Flood of 1862, which impacted the entire Western United States, and had a bearing on the Civil War. In San Diego, Mission Valley was inundated, and houses in lower Old Town were flooded when severe winds from a sea storm from the south backed the water up from the bay into the river (Pourade 1964:250). This flood was very significant because it held its peak for over twenty-four hours. In 1876, the levee was reconstructed, and no further diversions into San Diego Bay have occurred. Since then, a considerable volume of sediment has been added to the San Diego River delta in Mission Bay from occasional floods.

In 1935 El Capitan Dam was constructed 27 miles up the San Diego River; this reduced the sediment entering the bay considerably. An earlier dam was overtopped in 1916, increasing the floodwaters coming down Mission Valley at the time. The Mission Bay and San Diego River jetties were built in 1948, at a time when the shore of the bay was subject to alternating periods of recession and advance. By February 1951, the river levees had been connected to the jetties. All tidal flow was confined to a new channel. Since the river discharges only during flooding, the middle channel was soon completely filled. The channels were finished by 1955, after various difficulties were overcome and the jetties were considerably lengthened so that shallow bars would not form in the entrance.

Water rights 
In 1921, the city of San Diego filed suit against the Cuyamaca Water Company to establish its paramount right to the water of the San Diego River. After several court cases, the California State Supreme Court declared in 1929 that the city's right was paramount because under Spanish and Mexican laws, the pueblo of San Diego was given exclusive rights to the use of the San Diego River, both surface and underground. The Treaty of Guadalupe-Hidalgo obligated the U.S. to protect the grants and privileges decreed under the old rule.

Course 
The river travels  from its headwaters to the ocean. The river's tributaries include:
Oak Canyon Creek
Spring Canyon Creek
Forester Creek
Los Coches Creek
San Vicente Creek
Wildcat Canyon Creek
Chocolate Creek
Conejos Creek
Sand Creek
Isham Creek
Boulder Creek
Cedar Creek
Ritchie Creek
Dye Canyon Creek
Iron Springs Canyon Creek	
Temescal Creek
Sentenac Creek
Coleman Creek
Baily Creek
Jim Green Creek
Boring Creek
Marriette Creek
Eastwood Creek

Four additional reservoirs lie in the river's watershed. Cuyamaca Reservoir is located on Boulder Creek and San Vicente Reservoir is fed by San Vicente Creek.  Lake Jennings and Lake Murray are formed by the damming of canyons.

The San Diego River Park Foundation was founded in 2001 and is dedicated to conserving the water, wildlife, recreation, culture and community involved with the San Diego River.

The San Diego River Conservancy was established by an act of the California Legislature to preserve, restore and enhance the San Diego River area. The Conservancy is a non-regulatory agency of the state government with an independent nine-member governing board. It is tasked to acquire, manage and conserve land and to protect or provide recreational opportunities, open space, wildlife species and habitat, wetlands, water quality, natural flood conveyance, historical/cultural resources, and educational opportunities. One important goal is to help create a river-long park and hiking trail, stretching the full length of the river from its headwaters in the Cuyamaca Mountains to the Pacific Ocean.

Crossings
From mouth to source:

San Diego
Sunset Cliffs Boulevard/Sea World Drive
West Mission Bay Drive/Sports Arena Boulevard
Interstate 5  (San Diego Freeway)
Pacific Highway
NCTD's Coaster & Amtrak Pacific Surfliner
San Diego Trolley Blue Line
San Diego Trolley Green Line
Morena Boulevard
San Diego Trolley Green Line
Fashion Valley Road
Avenida Del Rio
State Route 163  (Cabrillo Freeway)
Mission Center Road & San Diego Trolley Green Line
Camino Del Este & San Diego Trolley Green Line
Qualcomm Way
Interstate 805 Mission Valley Viaduct  (Jacob Dekema Freeway)
Interstate & State Route 15  (Escondido Freeway)
Rancho Mission Road/Ward Road & San Diego Trolley Green Line
San Diego Mission Road/Twain Avenue
Friars Road

Santee
West Hills Parkway
State Route 52 
Carlton Hills Boulevard
Cuyamaca Street
Magnolia Avenue

Lakeside
Riverford Road
Channel Road
State Route 67 
Ashwood Street
El Capitan Dam

Julian
State Routes 78 & 79

References

External links
 San Diego River Watershed Management Plan
 San Diego River Park Foundation
 Lakeside's River Park Conservancy

 
Rivers of San Diego County, California
Cuyamaca Mountains
Geography of San Diego
San Diego metropolitan area
Ocean Beach, San Diego
Santee, California
San Diego Bay watershed
Watersheds of California
Mission Valley, San Diego
Parks in San Diego
Rivers of Southern California